WPNV-LP (106.3 FM) is a low-power FM radio station licensed to serve the community of Peoria, Illinois. The station is owned by Black Business Alliance Peoria Chapter. It airs an Urban Adult Contemporary music format.

External links
 WPNV official website
 

PNV-LP
PNV-LP
Urban adult contemporary radio stations in the United States
Radio stations established in 2014
2014 establishments in Illinois